A sledgehammer is a large manual impact tool which has a metal head distinguishing it from a mallet with head made of softer material.

Sledgehammer or Sledge Hammer may also refer to:

People
 911 (wrestler), also known as Sledge Hammer, stage name of professional wrestler Al Poling (born 1957)
 Eugene Sledge, United States Marine PFC, nicknamed Sledgehammer

Arts, entertainment, and media

Music
 "Sledgehammer" (Peter Gabriel song), 1986
 "Sledgehammer" (Fifth Harmony song), 2014
 "Sledgehammer" (Rihanna song), 2016
 "Sledgehammer", a song by Bachman-Turner Overdrive from their 1974 album Not Fragile

Television
 Sledge Hammer!, a satirical TV sitcom which ran from 1986 to 1988
 "Sledgehammer" (Grey's Anatomy), a 2015 episode of Grey's Anatomy

Other arts, entertainment, and media
 Sledgehammer (film), a slasher film from 1983
 Sledgehammer, video game character from Clock Tower 3
 Sledgehammer Blues, an independent record label
 Sledgehammer Games, a video game studio owned by Activision

Military operations
 Sledgehammer (coup plan), an alleged military coup plan in Turkey
 Operation Sledgehammer, a 1942 Allied plan in World War II for cross-Channel invasion of Europe (not executed)
 Operation Sledgehammer (2007), 2007 military search operation during the Iraq war

Other uses
 Sledgehammer (Isabelle), a tool of the Isabelle proof assistant
 Sledgehammer (ride), a ride at Canada's Wonderland theme park
 Sledgehammer Corvette, an 880hp Corvette modified by Callaway Cars
 Opteron, a 64-bit CPU made by AMD, codenamed Sledgehammer